Super Rugby Aupiki is a professional women's rugby union club competition in New Zealand. Its inaugural season was held in March 2022. It is a steppingstone between the Farah Palmer Cup and the Black Ferns. Aupiki translates as ‘the ascent to the upper most realm’.

Format 
In 2022, the four teams were supposed to have three regular season matches with one home and away game, and one Super Round fixture. The top two teams at the end of the three rounds would contest the final. The competition was reformatted as a round robin fixture because of the impact of COVID-19. All the squads were strongly affected with player isolations and COVID-19 cases. The inaugural champion was crowned based on their competition points after the final round.

The 2023 season is expected to be played over a period of five weeks with ten games in total. Each team will play three regular season matches and two play-off matches.

History 
The Chiefs Manawa won the inaugural title of the 2022 Super Rugby Aupiki season. They defeated the Blues Women 35–0 in the final round of the competition.

Teams 
There are four teams that compete in the competition. The three teams based in the north are aligned with their Super Rugby franchises, namely the Blues, Chiefs and Hurricanes. The southern team, Matatū, is governed by the Crusaders and also includes the Highlanders region.

Champions
The following sides have won Super Rugby Aupiki titles.

Players

All four sides will contract 28-players for the inaugural Super Rugby Aupiki season. All players will be paid for participating within the tournament, with all players being on professional or semi-professional contracts.

Television
Matches in the Super Rugby Aupiki competition will be shown by Sky Sport in New Zealand.

See also

New Zealand women's national rugby union team
New Zealand women's national rugby sevens team
Farah Palmer Cup
Women's rugby union in New Zealand
Super W

Notes

References 

 
Rugby union leagues in New Zealand
Professional sports leagues in New Zealand
2021 establishments in New Zealand
Sports leagues established in 2021
Women's rugby union competitions in New Zealand
Rugby union
Rugby union competitions for provincial teams